Jan Stefan Widacki (born 6 January 1948 in Kraków) is a Polish lawyer, historian, essayist, academic (professor since 1988), diplomat and politician.

Life 
In 1969, Widacki graduated from law at the Jagiellonian University. He studied also philosophy. He is an author of over 10 books and numerous articles. He was a faculty member of the John Paul II Catholic University of Lublin (from 1977) and the University of Silesia (1983–1990). He was a vice minister of interior in the Cabinet of Tadeusz Mazowiecki (1990–1992), Polish ambassador to Lithuania (1992–1996), and Member to the Sejm (2007–2011).

He has been member of several political parties and associations: Polish United Workers' Party, Solidarity, Democratic Left Alliance, Alliance of Democrats, Democratic Party – demokraci.pl.

Honours 

 Officer's Cross of the Order of Polonia Restituta (2005)
 Knight's Cross of the Order of Polonia Restituta (2000)
 Commander's Grand Cross of the Order of the Lithuanian Grand Duke Gediminas (1996)

References

External links
Biography at the page of Sejm

1948 births
Ambassadors of Poland to Lithuania
Recipients of the Order of Polonia Restituta
Jagiellonian University alumni
Living people
Members of the Polish Sejm 2007–2011

Commander's Grand Crosses of the Order of the Lithuanian Grand Duke Gediminas
Solidarity (Polish trade union) activists
20th-century Polish lawyers
21st-century Polish lawyers
Polish United Workers' Party members
Democratic Party – demokraci.pl politicians
Democratic Left Alliance politicians
Alliance of Democrats (Poland) politicians
Scholars of criminal law
Academic staff of Jagiellonian University
Academic staff of the John Paul II Catholic University of Lublin
Academic staff of the University of Silesia in Katowice
Knights of the Order of Polonia Restituta
Officers of the Order of Polonia Restituta